East Liberty may refer to:
 East Liberty, Indiana
 East Liberty, Ohio
 East Liberty (Pittsburgh), a neighborhood of Pittsburgh
 East Liberty (novel), a novel by Joseph Bathanti set in the Pittsburgh neighborhood of the same name